The third season of Dancing Brasil premiered on Wednesday, January 17, 2018 at 10:30 p.m. (BRT / AMT) on RecordTV.

On April 11, 2018, TV host Geovanna Tominaga & Lucas Teodoro won the competition with 34.82% of the public vote over model Raissa Santana & Paulo Victor Souza (32.91%) and actress Bárbara Borges & Marquinhos Costa (32.27%). This was the first season to feature an all-female final three.

Cast

Couples

Scoring chart

Key
 
 
  Eliminated
  Risk zone
  Immunity
  Third place
  Runner-up
  Winner

Weekly scores
Individual judges' scores in the charts below (given in parentheses) are listed in this order from left to right: Jaime Arôxa, Fernanda Chamma, Paulo Goulart Filho.

Week 1: First Dances 
The couples performed rumba, forró, samba, salsa, foxtrot, pasodoble, cha-cha-cha, tango or jive.

Running order

Week 2: Movie Night 
The couples performed one unlearned dance to famous film songs. Waltz is introduced.

Running order

Week 3: 80s Night 
The couples performed one unlearned dance to famous 80s songs. Zouk and quickstep are introduced.

Running order

Week 4: Masquerade Ball 
The couples performed one unlearned masquerade ball-inspired dance.

Running order

Week 5: Life Moments 
The couples performed one unlearned dance to celebrate the most memorable moment of their lives.

Running order

Week 6: Free Theme 
Running order

Week 7: Team Dances 
The couples performed one unlearned dance and a team dance-off for extra points.

Running order

The ten couples were divided in two teams of five based on the couple's place at the previous week's leaderboard. The red team (the top group) and the white team (the bottom group) participated in a dance-off with the winners receiving three points to be added to their total scores.

Week 8: Women's Night 
The couples performed one unlearned dance dedicated to a meaningful woman in their life in order to celebrate the International Women's Day on March 8, 2018.

Running order

Week 9: TV Series Night 
The couples performed one unlearned dance to famous TV series theme songs.

Running order

Week 10: Jive Marathon 

Running order

After the individual routines were performed, the bottom three couples (Geovanna & Teo, Joana & Bruno and Marina & Jefferson) competed in a marathon-style instant jive, where Geovanna & Teo received immunity and avoided elimination this week, while the remaining couples were placed in the Risk Zone. Joana & Bruno received the fewest votes to save and were eliminated over Marina & Jefferson.

Week 11: Latin Music Night 
Individual judges' scores in the chart below (given in parentheses) are listed in this order from left to right: Jaime Arôxa, Sidney Magal, Fernanda Chamma, Paulo Goulart Filho.

The couples performed one unlearned trio dance involving an eliminated pro to famous latin songs.

Running order

Week 12: Semifinals 

The couples performed their final unlearned dance and a redemption dance chosen by the judges.

Running order

Week 13: Finals 

The couples performed a new routine of their favorite dance style, a solo dance and a showdance.

Running order

Dance chart 
 Week 1: One unlearned dance (First Dances)
 Week 2: One unlearned dance (Movie Night)
 Week 3: One unlearned dance (80s Night)
 Week 4: One unlearned dance (Masquerade Ball)
 Week 5: One unlearned dance (Life Moments)
 Week 6: One unlearned dance (Free Theme)
 Week 7: One unlearned dance and team dances (Team Dances)
 Week 8: One unlearned dance (Women's Night)
 Week 9: One unlearned dance (TV Series Night)
 Week 10: One unlearned dance (Jive Marathon)
 Week 11: One unlearned dance (Latin Music Night)
 Week 12: One unlearned dance and redemption dance (Semifinals)
 Week 13: Favorite dance style, solo dance and showdance (Finals)

 Highest scoring dance
 Lowest scoring dance

Ratings and reception

Brazilian ratings
All numbers are in points and provided by Kantar Ibope Media.

References

External links 

 Dancing Brasil on R7.com

2018 Brazilian television seasons